, also known as , is an arcade video game in the Bubble Bobble series developed by Taito in 1994. While being a new Bubble Bobble for a new generation, it takes place after Parasol Stars.

Gameplay

For this adventure, Bubblun and Bobblun, the familiar green and blue bubble dragons, are joined by girls Kululun (an orange dragon) and Cororon (a purple dragon). However, they are stated to be the children of the Bub and Bob of the first game.

According to the intro, the four characters (as humans) inadvertently unleash Hyper Drunk, the final boss, while reading books. Hyper Drunk transforms the four into bubble dragons and banishes them to a new world.

Characters
 is the well-rounded character; he can fire three grouped bubbles straight ahead when powered up (the bubble button is held for a few seconds then released).
 has faster speed in exchange for shorter range. He can shoot three bubbles in a spread pattern when powered up.
 has the longest available range, but is slow. She can shoot her bubbles in a "T" pattern (forwards, backwards, and down) when powered up.
 has the fastest bubble blowing and can shoot her bubbles in an inverted-"T" pattern (forwards, backwards, and up) when powered up.

Although a sequel to Bubble Bobble, the game inaugurates few changes to the gameplay formula of that title. The small changes that have been made are that a boss is now encountered every five to ten levels, giving those scenes a similar prominence to Rainbow Islands, and the player takes a branching route through the levels by selecting one of two doors after every boss. The players can now charge the bubble shot; if released when the dragon's horns or bow is glowing, he/she will breathe three bubbles at once, with the specific formation dependent on the character chosen. The players must collect certain square cards with music notes inside, in order to get the 4 keys that lead to the final world or face an early false ending. Also, the characters have to collect a rod to turn their characters from their dragon to human forms during the course of the game.

Cameos
The includes cameos by other Taito characters and settings from The NewZealand Story, Darius, Space Invaders, Arkanoid, Liquid Kids, KiKi KaiKai (including Cindy, known in Japanese version as Sayo-chan and the English Pocky & Rocky games as Pocky), Yūyu no Quiz de Go! Go!, Pu·Li·Ru·La, and The Fairyland Story.

Continuity
 Within the context of the game world, Bubble Memories - The Story of Bubble Bobble III takes place before Bubble Symphony, even though the latter is released earlier.
 All the enemies from the original Bubble Bobble appear in this game, along with a lot of newer enemies.
 The credits (in the arcade version) show all the enemies' names, and those of characters who make cameos from other Taito games.

Ports
The only home port of Bubble Symphony was for the Sega Saturn in Japan.

It was included in the Taito Legends 2 compilation for Microsoft Windows in North America and Europe, and on the Xbox in Europe only. It was released on the PlayStation 2 in Japan only, via Taito Memories II Volume 2. The Xbox and PS2 versions run in upscanned 640x448 resolution, which results in slight flickering, no scanlines, and slightly blurrier image compared to the Arcade and Sega Saturn versions. A PlayStation version was completed, and was going to be published by Virgin Interactive, but was never released.

Soundtrack

 is a video game soundtrack that was released on CD and published by Pony Canyon and Scitron Label on January 20, 1995 in Japan. Tracks 1, 2 and 22 were arranged by Yasuko Yamada, Yasutaka Mizushima and Tamayo Kawamoto.

 was released by Zuntata Records and Taito Corp on July 31, 2013 in Japan.

Reception 
In Japan, Game Machine listed Bubble Symphony on their December 1, 1994 issue as being the fourth most-successful table arcade game of the year.

References

External links

Bubble Symphony at Arcade History.com

1994 video games
Arcade video games
Cooperative video games
Platform games
Cancelled PlayStation (console) games
Sega Saturn games
Bubble Bobble
Video games scored by Allister Brimble
Taito arcade games
Taito F3 System games
Video games developed in Japan